Pecking order is a hierarchical system.

Pecking order may also refer to:

 Pecking Order (film), a 2017 New Zealand film
 Pecking Order (game), a card game
 Pecking order theory, a financial model